Geoffrey Fox may refer to:
Geoffrey Fox (died 1966), one of the police officers murdered in the Shepherd's Bush murders
Geoffrey C. Fox (born 1944), professor of informatics and computing at Indiana University
Geoff Fox (born 1950), American television meteorologist
Geoff Fox (footballer, born 1925) (1925–1994), English footballer
Geoff Fox (Australian footballer) (1910–1971), Australian footballer
Geoff Fox, CEO and founder of Fox Racing

See also
Jeffrey Fox, President and CEO of Convergys